GSAT-10 is an Indian communication satellite which was launched by Ariane-5ECA carrier rocket in September 2012. It has 12 KU Band, 12 C Band and 6 lower extended c band transponders, and included a navigation payload to augment GAGAN capacity. Following its launch and on-orbit testing, it was placed in Geosynchronous orbit at 83.0° East, from where it will provide communication services in India.

Payload
12 high power KU-band transponders employing 140 W TWTA. It is being used by Tata Sky
12 C Band Transponders employing 32 W TWTA.
6 extended C-Band Transponders each having a bandwidth of 36 MHz employing 32 W TWTA.
GAGAN navigation payload operating in L1 and L5 bands.

Satellite
GSAT-10, with a design life of 15 years was operational by November 2012 and will augment telecommunication, Direct-To-Home and radio navigation services. At 3,400 kg at lift-off, at the time, it was the heaviest satellite built by the Bengaluru-headquartered Indian Space Research Organisation (ISRO). It was ISRO's 101st space mission. Arianespace's heavy lifting Ariane-5 ECA rocket launched the satellite about 30 minutes after the blast off from the European launch pad in South America at 2:48AM, prior to which it injected European co-passenger ASTRA 2F into orbit. GSAT-10 carries 30 transponders (12 Ku-band, 12 C-band and six Extended C-Band), which will provide vital augmentation to INSAT/GSAT transponder capacity. The GAGAN payload will provide improved accuracy of GPS signals (of better than seven metres) which will be used by Airports Authority of India for civil aviation requirements. This is the second satellite in INSAT/GSAT constellation with GAGAN payload after GSAT-8, which was launched in May 2011.

Launch
GSAT-10 is the second satellite in INSAT/GSAT constellation with GAGAN payload after GSAT-8, launched in May 2011. The satellite was successfully launched on 29 September 2012 at 2:48 am (IST) on board Ariane-5 rocket from Europe's spaceport in French Guiana.

Cost
The satellite and launch fee cost the agency ₹750 crores.

See also 

 Indian Regional Navigational Satellite System
 Global Navigation Satellite System
 GPS
 GSAT

References

External links
 ISRO Future Programmes

GSAT satellites
2012 in India
Spacecraft launched in 2012
Communications satellites in geostationary orbit
Ariane commercial payloads